The Lost Library: Gay Fiction Rediscovered, edited by Tom Cardamone, includes appreciations by 28 contemporary writers of significant gay novels and short story collections now out of print. The Lost Library includes an essay on reprints of gay literature by Philip Clark. Published in March 2010, it features a cover illustration by Mel Odom.

Table of contents
Introduction — Tom Cardamone
Rabih Alameddine, The Perv: Stories — Michael Graves
Allen Barnett, The Body and Its Dangers — Christopher Bram
Neil Bartlett, Ready to Catch Him, Should He Fall — Philip Clark
George Baxt, A Queer Kind of Death — Larry Duplechan
Bruce Benderson, User — Rob Stephenson
Christopher Coe, Such Times — Jameson Currier
Daniel Curzon, Something You Do in the Dark — Jesse Monteagudo
Melvin Dixon, Vanishing Rooms — Ian Rafael Titus
John Donovan, I'll Get There. It Better Be Worth the Trip — Martin Wilson
Robert Ferro, The Blue Star — Stephen Greco
John Gilgun, Music I Never Dreamed Of — Wayne Courtois
Agustín Gómez-Arcos, The Carnivorous Lamb — Richard Reitsma
Michael Grumley, Life Drawing — Sam Miller
Lynn Hall, Sticks and Stones — Sean Meriwether
Richard Hall, Couplings — Jonathan Harper
J.S. Marcus, The Captain’s Fire — Aaron Hamburger
James McCourt, Time Remaining — Tim Young
Mark Merlis, American Studies — Rick Whitaker
Charles Nelson, The Boy Who Picked the Bullets Up — Jim Marks
Kyle Onstott and Lance Horner, Child of the Sun — Michael Bronski
Roger Peyrefitte, The Exile of Capri — Gregory Woods
Paul Reed, Longing — Bill Brent
Paul Rogers, Saul's Book — Paul Russell
Patrick Roscoe, Birthmarks — Andy Quan
Douglas Sadownick, Sacred Lips of the Bronx — Tom Cardamone
Glenway Wescott, The Apple of the Eye — Jerry Rosco
George Whitmore, Nebraska — Victor Bumbalo
Donald Windham, Two People, Philip Gambone
Come Again: A History of the Reprinting of Gay Novels, Philip Clark

Awards
The Lost Library won the San Francisco Book Festival's gay category for best book of the spring season, and was named one of the 10 best nonfiction books of 2010 in Richard Labonté's Book Marks column.

References 

Gay male literature
2010s LGBT literature
2010 non-fiction books
2010 anthologies
LGBT anthologies
Essays about literature